Bielak is a surname. Notable people with the surname include:

 Brandon Bielak (born 1996), American baseball pitcher
 Jacobo Bielak, Mexican-born structural engineer
 Józef Bielak (1741–1794), Polish-Lithuanian military officer
 Lukáš Bielák (born 1986), Slovak footballer
 Piotr Bielak (born 1976), Polish footballer

See also
 

Polish-language surnames
Slovak-language surnames